Silvija Mrakovčić, née Babić is a retired Croatian long jumper and triple jumper.

She won the bronze medal in long jump at the 1993 Mediterranean Games. She also competed at the European Championships in 1990 and 1994 without reaching the final.

Her personal best jump was 6.68 metres, achieved in June 1990 in Belgrade. In the triple jump she had 13.71 metres, achieved in May 1995 in Ljubljana.

References

External links

Yugoslav female long jumpers
Croatian female long jumpers
Croatian female triple jumpers
1968 births
Living people
Mediterranean Games bronze medalists for Croatia
Mediterranean Games medalists in athletics
Athletes (track and field) at the 1993 Mediterranean Games